The statue of Jude the Apostle is an outdoor sculpture by Jan Oldřich Mayer, installed on the north side of the Charles Bridge in Prague, Czech Republic.

External links

 

Christian sculptures
Monuments and memorials in Prague
Sculptures depicting New Testament people
Sculptures of men in Prague
Statues of apostles
Statues on the Charles Bridge